is a railway station on the West Japan Railway Company (JR West) Katamachi Line (Gakkentoshi Line) in Seika, Soraku District, Kyoto Prefecture, Japan. There is a transfer at this station to the nearby Shin-Hōsono Station on Kintetsu Kyoto Line.

Layout
Hōsono Station has two side platforms serving two tracks.

Platforms

Bus connections
Nara Kotsu

 Platform 1
 36, 47, 48, 74
 Platform 2
 38, 39, 41
 Platform 3
 66, 73
 Seika circuit bus
 North Route
 South Route

Stations next to Hōsono

History 
Station numbering was introduced in March 2018 with Hōsono being assigned station number JR-H20.

References

External links

Railway stations in Kyoto Prefecture
Railway stations in Japan opened in 1898